Gábor Demjén (born 1 March 1986 in Szob) is a Hungarian footballer who currently plays for Abahani Limited.

Career
Demjén started his career as a trainee in the youth team of Újpest FC. Later on, he decided to leave the club for the Romanian second division club CF Liberty Salonta in order to gain experience. In 2005, he decided to move with the chairman of the Romanian club Marius Vizer to the Hungarian first division outfit FC Sopron. After two years of success with the club, he moved on to the Nemzeti Bajnokság I treble champion Debreceni VSC in the 2007–08 season where he managed to win the Hungarian Cup.

International career

In the 2002–03 season, he was a member of the Hungarian national under-17 football team that reached the group stage of the 2003 UEFA European Under-17 Football Championship in Portugal.

Honours
Debreceni VSC
 Nemzeti Bajnokság I: 2008–09; runner-up 2007–08
 Magyar Kupa: 2007–08

External links
 Mindenki licenchez jutott 

1986 births
Living people
People from Szob
Hungarian footballers
Hungary youth international footballers
Vác FC players
Vasas SC players
Újpest FC players
CF Liberty Oradea players
Debreceni VSC players
FC Sopron players
Fehérvár FC players
Nyíregyháza Spartacus FC players
Pécsi MFC players
Balmazújvárosi FC players
Nemzeti Bajnokság I players
Hungarian expatriate footballers
Expatriate footballers in Romania
Hungarian expatriate sportspeople in Romania
Association football midfielders
Hungary under-21 international footballers
Sportspeople from Pest County
21st-century Hungarian people